Nonnell is an unincorporated community located in Muhlenberg County, Kentucky, United States.

History
Nonnell was originally named Elk Valley. The community was renamed for John Lennon who was a maintenance supervisor for the Louisville and Nashville Railroad with his surname being reversed. From 1916 to 1931, the post office was known as Tarma for unknown reasons.

Notable people
Bill J. Dukes, Alabama politician, was born in Nonnell in 1927, when the community was known as Tarma.

See also
 List of geographic names derived from anagrams and ananyms

References

Unincorporated communities in Muhlenberg County, Kentucky
Unincorporated communities in Kentucky